A leap year starting on Tuesday is any year with 366 days (i.e. it includes 29 February) that begins on Tuesday, 1 January, and ends on Wednesday, 31 December. Its dominical letters hence are FE. The most recent year of such kind was 2008 and the next one will be 2036 in the Gregorian calendar or, likewise 2020 and 2048 in the obsolete Julian calendar.

Any leap year that starts on Tuesday, Friday or Saturday has only one Friday the 13th; the only one in this leap year occurs in June. Common years starting on Wednesday share this characteristic.

In this leap year, Martin Luther King Jr. Day is on its latest possible date, January 21, Valentine's Day is on a Thursday, Presidents' Day is on February 18, the leap day is on a Friday, Saint Patrick's Day is on Monday, Memorial Day is on May 26, Juneteenth is on a Thursday, U.S. Independence Day and Halloween are on a Friday, Labor Day is on its earliest possible date, September 1, Thanksgiving in is on November 27, and Christmas is on a Thursday.

The Election Day in the USA is on November 4th, as well in common years starting on Wednesday.

Calendars

Applicable years

Gregorian Calendar 
Leap years that begin on Tuesday, like those that start on Wednesday, occur at a rate of approximately 14.43% of all total leap years in a 400-year cycle of the Gregorian calendar. Their overall occurrence is 3.5% (14 out of 400).

400 year cycle

century 1: 8, 36, 64, 92

century 2: 104, 132, 160, 188

century 3: 228, 256, 284

century 4: 324, 352, 380

Julian Calendar 
Like all leap year types, the one starting with 1 January on a Tuesday occurs exactly once in a 28-year cycle in the Julian calendar, i.e. in 3.57% of years. As the Julian calendar repeats after 28 years that means it will also repeat after 700 years, i.e. 25 cycles. The year's position in the cycle is given by the formula ((year + 8) mod 28) + 1).

References 

Gregorian calendar
Julian calendar
Tuesday